Rhabditida is an order of free-living, zooparasitic, and phytoparasitic microbivorous nematodes living in soil.

The Cephalobidae, Panagrolaimidae, Steinernematidae, and Strongyloididae seem to be closer to the Tylenchia, regardless of whether these are merged with the Rhabditia or not.

Families
Rhabditida
Myolaimina
Incertae sedis
Myolaimoidea
Myolaimidae
Rhabditina
Bunonematomorpha
Bunonematoidea
Bunonematidae
Diplogasteromorpha
Cylindrocorporoidea
Cylindrocorporidae
Diplogasteroidea
Cephalobiidae
Diplogasteridae
Diplogasteroididae
Rhabditomorpha
Mesorhabditoidea
Peloderidae
Rhabditoidea
Rhabditidae
Spirurina
Ascaridomorpha
Ascaridoidea
Acanthocheilidae
Anisakidae
Ascarididae
Heterocheilidae
Raphidascarididae
Cosmocercoidea
Atractidae
Kathlaniidae
Seuratoidea
Cucullanidae
Quimperiidae
Gnathostomatomorpha
Gnathostomatoidea
Gnathostomatidae
Oxyuridomorpha
Oxyuroidea
Pharygnodonidae
Thelastomatoidea
Thelastomatidae
Spiruromorpha
Acuarioidea
Acuariidae
Camallanoidea
Camallanidae
Filarioidea
Onchocercidae
Habronematoidea
Cystidicolidae
Tetrameridae
Physalopteroidea
Physalopteridae
Thelazioidea
Rhabdochonidae
Tylenchina
Cephalobomorpha
Cephaloboidea
Cephalobidae
Drilonematomorpha
Drilonematoidea
Drilonematidae
Homungellidae
Ungellidae
Panagrolaimomorpha
Panagrolaimoidea
Panagrolaimidae
Strongyloidoidea
Alloionematidae
Tylenchomorpha
Aphelenchoidea
Aphelenchidae
Aphelenchoididae
Criconematoidea
Criconematidae
Hemicycliophoridae
Sphaerularioidea
Anguinidae
Neotylenchidae
Tylenchoidea
Belonolaimidae
Dolichodoridae
Hoplolaimidae
Incertae sedis
Deladenus Thorne, 1941
Paratylenchus Micoletzky, 1922
Radopholus Thorne, 1949
Tylenchorhynchus Cobb, 1913
Pratylenchidae
Tylenchidae

References

 
Nematode orders